Lauter (in its lower course: Winkelbach) is a river of Hesse, Germany. Its source is in the Odenwald near Gadernheim. It passes through Bensheim and flows into the Rhine in Gernsheim.

See also
List of rivers of Hesse

References

Rivers of Hesse
Rivers of Germany